"Tänd ett ljus" ("Light a Candle") is a song written by Niklas Strömstedt and Lasse Lindbom and recorded by Swedish band Triad in 1987. The outro includes Christmas and New Year's greetings in different languages. The song is sung a cappella with finger-snapping in the background. The single topped the Swedish singles chart on 6 January 1988. The song was at Svensktoppen for eight weeks during the period 20 December 1987 through 14 February 1988.

The theme of the song is that Christmas will light a candle as a symbol of hope for a better world. It has become a Christmas classic in Sweden, and is often included in Christmas music collections.

In 1993, Shanes covered the song with musical accompaniment. In 2007, Sandelin & Ekman recorded their own cover.

Personnel 

Triad

 Lasse Lindbom – lead, harmony and background vocals; finger snapping
 Niklas Strömstedt – lead, harmony and background vocals; finger snapping
 Janne Bark – harmony and background vocals; finger snapping

Charts

References

External links 

 

1987 songs
Swedish Christmas songs
Swedish-language songs
Number-one singles in Sweden
A cappella songs
Songs written by Lasse Lindbom